Rickey Williams Jr. (born 1977/1978) is an American politician, the first African-American to serve as mayor of Danville, Illinois, the county seat of Vermilion County.

Biography
Raised in Danville, Williams is the son of Laura and Ricky Williams Sr. His mother was an adult educator and his father was an assistant warden at the Danville Correctional Center and a teacher at the Danville Area Community College. He has a younger sister. He graduated from Millikin University with a B.A. in Political Science. He then attended the PhD program at Emory University but left on a Christian missions trip to Malawi before completing his dissertation. He returned to the US and served as a  residential missionary in Clarkston, Georgia and in 2006, as Executive Director of the local Boys & Girls Club.

In 2009, he won election to the Danville City Council. In 2011, he ran for mayor, finishing in 3rd place. In October 2018, he was named as acting mayor by the City Council after the early resignation of Scott Eisenhauer, who had served as mayor for over 15 years in order to take a position as village administrator in Rantoul, Illinois. He was sworn in on November 6, 2018. In the general election held on April 2, 2019, running on a platform of community policing and fiscal responsibility, he won election to a full 4-year term with 47.8% of the vote defeating businessowner James McMahon (24.0%), Alderman and businessman Steve Nichols (19.0%), and Danville Code Enforcement Inspector Donald Crews (8.8%). Danville was roughly 56% white, 33% Black, and 7% Hispanic at the time.  He was sworn in on May 7, 2019.

While mayor, he solicited funds to demolish the Collins Tower, a Danville landmark built in 1917 and listed on the National Register of Historic Places.

References

1970s births
Living people
African-American mayors in Illinois
21st-century African-American people
Millikin University alumni